The Ministry of Sustainability and the Environment (MSE; ;) is a ministry of the Government of Singapore responsible for the formulation and implementation of policies related to the environment, water and food of Singapore.

History 
The Ministry of Sustainability and the Environment (MSE) was established in 1972 as the Ministry of the Environment (ENV). It was later renamed the Ministry of Environment and Water Resources (MEWR) in 2004. On 25 July 2020, the Ministry was renamed to Ministry of Sustainability and the Environment.

Responsibilities 
The Ministry is responsible for providing a quality living environment and a high standard of public health, protected against the spread of communicable diseases. It also has to ensure a clean and hygienic living environment, as well as managing the complete water cycle – from sourcing, collection, purification, and supply of drinking water; to the treatment of used water and recycling into NEWater; desalination; as well as storm water drainage. Since 1 April 2019, it also handles food issues through the Singapore Food Agency.

Organisational structure 
The Ministry oversees three statutory boards – the National Environment Agency (NEA), Public Utilities Board (PUB), and the Singapore Food Agency (SFA).

Statutory Boards

 National Environment Agency
 Public Utilities Board
 Singapore Food Agency

Ministers 
The Ministry is headed by the Minister for Sustainability and the Environment, who is appointed as part of the Cabinet of Singapore. The incumbent minister is Grace Fu from the People's Action Party.

See also 
 Organisations of the Singapore Government
 President's Award for the Environment
 Statutory boards of the Singapore Government

References

External links 
 
 Official Facebook page

Sustainability and the Environment
Singapore
Singapore
Singapore
1972 establishments in Singapore
Singapore, Environment
Water in Singapore
Water management authorities